Dark money is a form of political donation in which donors are not disclosed.

Dark Money may also refer to:
 Dark Money (book), a 2016 non-fiction book by Jane Mayer 
 Dark Money (film), a 2018 documentary by Kimberly Reed 
 Dark Mon£y, a 2019 British miniseries about a child star who is sexually assaulted by a film producer while his parents are bribed to keep their silence. The drama takes inspiration from the life of Corey Haim who faced a similar incident during his career in the 1980s.

See also
 Black money (disambiguation)